Bangogae Station is a station of the Daegu Metro Line 2 in Naedang-dong, Seo District, and Duryu-dong, Dalseo District, Daegu, South Korea.

External links 
  Cyber station information  from Daegu Metropolitan Transit Corporation

Daegu Metro stations
Dalseo District
Seo District, Daegu
Railway stations opened in 2005